Arif Memduh Ün (14 March 1920 – 16 October 2015) was a Turkish film producer, director, actor and screenwriter. His film, The Broken Pots, was entered into the 11th Berlin International Film Festival.

Selected filmography
 The Broken Pots (1960)

References

External links

1920 births
2015 deaths
Vefa High School alumni
Turkish film producers
Turkish film directors
Turkish male film actors
Turkish male screenwriters
Film people from Istanbul
Best Director Golden Orange Award winners
Golden Orange Life Achievement Award winners
Best Director Golden Boll Award winners
20th-century Turkish screenwriters